

Bifus or Bisi was a medieval Bishop of the East Angles.

Bifus was consecrated in 669 or 670. He resigned the see in 672. He was the last bishop of the East Angles.

Bede in his history, records that he attended the Council of Hertford in 672. When he resigned, his bishopric was divided into the sees of Dunwich and Elmham.

References

External links
 

Bishops of the East Angles